Anderson Glacier is a heavily crevassed glacier  long, flowing southeast into Cabinet Inlet between Cape Casey and Balder Point, on the east coast of Graham Land.

History
Anderson Glacier was charted by the Falklands Islands Dependencies Survey (FIDS) and photographed from the air by the Ronne Antarctic Research Expedition in December 1947. It was named by FIDS for Sir John Anderson, M.P., Lord President of the Council and member of the British War Cabinet.

See also
 List of glaciers in the Antarctic
 Glaciology

References 

 

Glaciers of Graham Land
Foyn Coast